Scallop Hill is a volcanic dome rising to 225 m directly behind Cape Spirit on Black Island, in Antarctica's Ross Archipelago. Named by the New Zealand Geological Survey Antarctic Expedition (NZGSAE) (1958–59) after a fossiliferous conglomerate on top of the hill which contains a Chlamid lamellibranch commonly called scallops.

Volcanoes of the Ross Dependency
Black Island (Ross Archipelago)